Så mycket Olle Ljungström is a triple Olle Ljungström compilation album released in December 2012.  CD 1 and 2 consist of songs from Olle Ljungström's solo albums, while CD 3 consists of his songs from the Så mycket bättre 2012 programme, as well as a rerecording of his older song "Min trädgård".

Track listing

CD 1
En apa som liknar dig
Överallt
Jag och min far
Vatten, sol och ängar
Jag spelar vanlig
Sthlm, sthlm
Som man bäddar
Hur långt kan det gå
La la la
Du och jag
Jesus kan
Tysk indian
Kaffe & cigarette
Minns i november
Feber
En galen hund
Att vi älskar
Svenskt stål

CD 2
Norrländska präriens gudinna
Nåt för dom som väntar
Du sköna värld
Bara himlen ser på
Solens strålar
Det betyder ingenting
Som du
Somnar om
Sveriges sista cowboy
En förgiftad man
Happy End
Morotsman
Skjut dom som älskar
Nitroglycerin
Du ska bli min
Sötnos
Hjältar
Vila vid denna källa

CD 3
Dinga linga Lena
Om du lämnade mig nu
Johnny the Rucker
Rock n Roll
Eviva España
Who's That Girl
I min trädgård (acoustic)

Charts

References 

2012 compilation albums
Compilation albums by Swedish artists
Olle Ljungström albums